Toomas Raudam (born 21 July 1947) is an Estonian writer.

Career
Raudam was born in Paide.
He has won or been nominated for several other awards for his books, screenplays, and radio plays.

His many books include:

, 1983
, 1986
, 1988
, 1989
, 1990
, 1991
, 1992
, 1999
, 2000
, 2000
, 2001
, 2002
, 2003
, 2004
, 2005
, 2006
, 2008

Personal life
In 1974, Raudam married Kersti Veider, with whom he has one son, Juhan.
Graphic artist August Roosileht was Raudam's grandfather.

References

External links
 Biography at Estonia Literature Center
 Estonian Literary Magazine Spring 2005
Books by Raudam
Fridebert Tuglas Award Winners
Photograph of Raudam
Estonian Literary Magazine Autumn 1999

Living people
1947 births
Estonian male novelists
Estonian screenwriters
Estonian dramatists and playwrights
People from Paide
20th-century Estonian novelists
21st-century Estonian novelists